Aleksandr Gennadyevich Parshin (born 15 January 1986) is a former Russian professional football player.

Club career
He made his debut for FC Shinnik Yaroslavl on 2 July 2006 in a Russian Cup game against FC Dynamo Bryansk.

External links
 
 

1986 births
Living people
Russian footballers
Association football midfielders
FC Shinnik Yaroslavl players
FC Sheksna Cherepovets players